Venus Williams was the defending champion, but decided not to participate.
Caroline Wozniacki won the title, defeating Annika Beck in the final, 6–2, 6–2.

Seeds

Draw

Finals

Top half

Bottom half

Qualifying

Seeds

Qualifiers

Qualifying draw

First qualifier

Second qualifier

Third qualifier

Fourth qualifier

External links
 WTA tournament draws

BGL Luxembourg Open - Singles
2013 Singles
2013 in Luxembourgian tennis